Richard Rowland Kirkland (August 1843 – September 20, 1863), known as "The Angel of Marye's Heights", was a Confederate soldier during the American Civil War, noted by both sides for his bravery and the story of his humanitarian actions during the Battle of Fredericksburg.

Early life
Kirkland was born in Flat Rock, in Kershaw County, South Carolina. He was the fifth son of Mary and John Kirkland. He received a moderate education during his youth, as was typical during that era.

Early Army service
Despite his youth, Kirkland enlisted in the Confederate Army in 1861, not long after war was declared, before his older brothers. He was first assigned to Company E, 2nd South Carolina Volunteer Infantry, but was later transferred to Company G of the same regiment, and was promoted to sergeant. He first saw action during the First Battle of Bull Run (First Manassas), and later in the Battle of Savage's Station, Battle for Maryland Heights and Battle of Antietam, during which time many of his closest friends from Kershaw County were killed.

Battle of Fredericksburg

The story
On December 13, 1862, Kirkland's unit had formed at the stone wall at the base of "Marye's Heights" near Fredericksburg, Virginia. In the action that followed, he and his unit inflicted heavy casualties on the Union attackers. On the night of December 13, walking wounded made their way to the field hospital while those who were disabled were forced to remain on the battlefield. The morning of December 14 revealed that over 8,000 Union soldiers had been shot in front of the stone wall at Marye's Heights. Many of those remaining on the battlefield were still alive, but suffering terribly from their wounds and a lack of water.

Soldiers from both sides were forced to listen to the painful cries of the wounded for hours, with neither side daring to venture out for fear of being shot by the enemy. At some point during the day, Kirkland allegedly approached Confederate Brig. Gen. Joseph B. Kershaw, also from Kershaw County, South Carolina, and informed him that he wished to help the wounded Union soldiers. By Kershaw's own account, at first, he denied the request, but later he relented. However, when Kirkland asked if he could show a white handkerchief, General Kershaw stated he could not do that. Kirkland responded, "All right, sir, I'll take my chances." 

Kirkland gathered all the canteens he could carry, filled them with water, then ventured out onto the battlefield. He ventured back and forth several times, giving the wounded Union soldiers water, warm clothing, and blankets. Soldiers from both the Union and Confederate armies watched as he performed his task, but no one fired a shot. General Kershaw later stated that he observed Kirkland for more than an hour and a half. At first, it was thought that the Union would open fire, which would result in the Confederacy returning fire, resulting in Kirkland being caught in a crossfire. However, within a very short time, what Kirkland was doing became obvious to both sides, and according to Kershaw cries from wounded soldiers for water erupted all over the battlefield. Kirkland did not stop until he had helped every wounded soldier (Confederate and Federal) on the Confederate end of the battlefield. Sergeant Kirkland's actions remain a legend in Fredericksburg to this day.

The truth of the story has been disputed. While the story seems to have been embellished, earlier sources show that it was not just made up by Kershaw, and has a plausible core.

Later engagements and death
Kirkland went on to fight in both the Battle of Chancellorsville and the Battle of Gettysburg where, after further distinguishing himself for courage and ability, he was promoted to lieutenant. On September 20, 1863, he and two other men took command of a charge near "Snodgrass Hill" during the Battle of Chickamauga. Realizing they had advanced too far forward of their own unit, they attempted to return and Kirkland was shot. His last words were, "I'm done for... save yourselves and please tell my Pa I died right." 

His body was returned home to Kershaw County, South Carolina, and he was buried in the "Old Quaker Cemetery" in Camden. A friend who visited the gravesite years later was said to have commented that it was one of the most sequestered, unfrequented, and inaccessible spots for a grave he'd ever seen. General Kershaw would later be buried in that same cemetery, which also maintains the graves of Civil War General John Bordenave Villepigue and his descendant, World War I Medal of Honor recipient John Canty Villepigue, in addition to World War I Medal of Honor recipient Richmond Hobson Hilton. 

In 1965, sculptor Felix de Weldon unveiled a statue in front of the stone wall at the Fredericksburg battlefield in Kirkland's honor. The Sons of Confederate Veterans posthumously awarded Kirkland their Confederate Medal of Honor, created in 1977.

References

Sources
Richard Rowland Kirkland "Angel of Mercy"
Richard Rowland Kirkland
First public account of Kirkland's actions at Marye's Heights
Is the Richard Kirkland Story True?

People of South Carolina in the American Civil War
People from Kershaw County, South Carolina
1843 births
1863 deaths
Confederate States Army officers
Fredericksburg, Virginia
Confederate States of America military personnel killed in the American Civil War